Middelburg is a town in the Eastern Cape province of South Africa, in the Great Karoo. It lies in the Upper Karoo, 1,279 m above sea level, with a population of 19,000. It falls under the Inxuba Yethemba Local Municipality, in the Chris Hani District Municipality.

History
In 1837 the Cape Colony government proclaimed the district of Colesberg, and established the Town of Middelburg in 1852, so named since it is midway between Graaff-Reinet and Colesberg. (It is also approximately halfway between Port Elizabeth and Bloemfontein, as well as between Johannesburg and Cape Town.)

The town and surrounding areas are rich in history from the Anglo Boer War. The adjacent Grootfontein College of Agriculture was established as a military camp and training centre for British troops.   About 7,000 troops from the Third Manchester Regiment were stationed at Grootfontein - some of them were married, so about 3,000 women and children also lived at Grootfontein. 

In 1910 the Union of South Africa took control of the farm after which the Grootfontein School of Agriculture was established in 1911. Today the college offers a two-year Certificate in Agriculture and a three-year Diploma in Agriculture, both accredited by the Higher Education Quality Committee.

The Cape Province branch of the National Party was constituted at a congress held in Middelburg on 15 September 1914, two months after the National Party's founding in Smithfield, Orange Free State Province. Over 300 delegates attended the meeting that would also choose Dr D.F. Malan, later Prime Minister of South Africa, as the provincial party's first chairman.

The R56, the shortest route between the Northern Cape and KwaZulu-Natal begins at Middelburg. The town's hospital is Wilhelm Stahl Provincial Hospital.

Persons born in Middelburg
Jozua François Naudé, Pastor in the Dutch Reformed Church, was born in Middelburg EC in 1873. 
Middelburg is also the birthplace of playwright Athol Fugard.  
Other well known South Africans who were born or lived in Middelburg include 
Eddie Stuart (Footballer), 
Steven Sykes (Rugby player), 
Keanu Vers (Rugby Player), 
Arthur Lennox Ochse (Cricketer), 
John James Clements (recipient of the Victoria Cross), 
Eric Rosenthal (historian and author), 
Cecily Norden (Horse industry), 
John Phillip Harison Acocks (botanist), 
Colin Turpin, Reader in Law at Clare College, Cambridge .

Climate

References

External links

Middelburg, Eastern Cape, middelburgec.co.za
Grootfontein College of Agriculture, gadi.agric.za
Manchester Regiment 3rd and 4th battalions

Populated places established in 1852
Populated places in the Inxuba Yethemba Local Municipality
Karoo
1852 establishments in the Cape Colony